Heino is a railway station located in Heino, Netherlands. The station was opened on 1 January 1881 and is located on the Zwolle–Almelo railway. The station lies outside of Heino, but can be reached by bus.

Train services

Bus services

External links
NS website 
Dutch Public Transport journey planner 

Railway stations in Overijssel
Railway stations opened in 1881
Raalte
1881 establishments in the Netherlands
Railway stations in the Netherlands opened in the 19th century